Pavel Pavlovich Borodin (born 25 October 1946) is a Russian  official and politician.

Borodin was born in the town of Shakhunya, near the city of Nizhny (Formerly known as Gorky during Soviet times) in the Nizhny Novgorod Region. 
Shortly after his birth, the family moved to the city of Kyzyl in the Tuva Region, which is situated in the far south of Siberia.

From 1993 to 2000, he was Head of the Presidential Property Management Department of the Russian Federation. According to the investigative journalist Jake Bernstein (2019), in that role Borodin signed a contract with a Swiss to renovate the Grand Kremlin Palace. Other contracts followed, as well as around $30 million on kickbacks that Borodin distributed to friends and fellow officials, including to then-president Boris Yeltsin (p. 92).

From 2000 to 2011, he was the State Secretary of the Union of Russia and Belarus.

In 2001, he was arrested in New York for money-laundering. Later, he was released on bond of five million Swiss francs. In 2002, his case was closed and the bond was returned while further details are not disclosed.

Honours and awards
 Order of Merit for the Fatherland, 2nd class (3 October 1996) - for outstanding services to the state and many years of diligent work
 Order of Francisc Skarina (Belarus)
 Order of Friendship of Peoples (Belarus) (11 December 2006) - for his great personal contribution to the development of comprehensive cooperation between Belarus and the Russian Federation, strengthening the Belarusian-Russian friendship
 Order of Merit (Moldova) (18 October 2001)
 Diploma of the Government of the Russian Federation (23 October 2006) - for services to the state and the contribution to the development and strengthening of Russian-Belarusian relations
 Order of Honour (21 November 2011) - for his contribution to the establishment and development of the Union State and the expansion of Russian-Belarusian cooperation
 Order "For Services to the Motherland", 3rd class (October 25, 2011 Belarus)
 Order of Merit (Transnistria, October 18, 2001) 
 Diploma of the Russian Federation (23 October 2006) - for services to the state and personal contribution to the development and strengthening of Russian-Belarusian relations
 State Prize of the Russian Federation - for the Restoration of the Kremlin (1996)
 Honoured Worker of the Republic of Sakha (Yakutia)
 Honorary Citizen of the City of London (2009)

References and notes

See also 
 Mabetex
 Carla Del Ponte
 Moscow Kremlin
 Behgjet Pacolli

External links 

 Yeltsin linked to bribe scandal, BBC News, September 8, 1999.
 Arrest warrant for Yeltsin aide, BBC News, January 27, 2000.
 Former Yeltsin aide arrested, BBC News, January 18, 2001.
 Yeltsin aide held in US jail, BBC News, January 19, 2001.
 Former Yeltsin aide denied bail, BBC News, January 26, 2001.
 Swiss want Yeltsin aide extradited, BBC News, February 5, 2001.
 Former Kremlin aide freed on bail, BBC News, April 12, 2001.
 Kremlin aide flies home on bail, BBC News, April 13, 2001.
 The Kremlin's Keeper, the World at His Fingertips, Is Under a Cloud by Michael Wines, The New York Times, September 16, 1999 (subscription required, full text freely available at ).
 Yeltsin Linked to Bribe Scheme by Sharon LaFraniere, The Washington Post, September 8, 1999.
 Biography (in Russian)

1946 births
Living people
1st class Active State Councillors of the Russian Federation
People from Shakhunya
Russian politicians
Russian businesspeople in real estate
Recipients of the Order "For Merit to the Fatherland", 2nd class
Recipients of the Order of Francysk Skaryna
Recipients of the Order of Honour (Russia)
State Prize of the Russian Federation laureates
Recipients of the Order "For Merit to the Fatherland", 4th class